The Rivière Lociane or L'Océane is a river of Haiti.

See also
List of rivers of Haiti

References
 GEOnet Names Server

Rivers of Haiti